The 2003 Pacific Games football tournament was an international football tournament held in Samoa from 30 June until 11 July 2003. The 10 national teams involved in the tournament were required to register a squad of players; only players in these squads were eligible to take part in the tournament.

Players' club teams and players' age as of 30 June 2003 – the tournament's opening day.

Group A

Fiji
Coach:  Tony Buesnel

Kiribati
Coach: Pine Iosefa

Solomon Islands
Coach:  George Cowie

Tuvalu
Coach:  Tim Jerks

Vanuatu
Coach: Juan Carlos Buzzetti

Group B

F.S. Micronesia
Coach:  Shimon Shenhar

New Caledonia
Coach:  Serge Martinengo de Novack

Papua New Guinea
Coach: Ludwig Peka

Tahiti
Coach:  Patrick Jacquemet

Tonga
Coach:  Milan Janković

References

Football at the 2003 South Pacific Games